Laila Salim Musa bin Khalifa or simply Leila bin Khalifa (born 11 October 1975) is a Libyan journalist, human rights activist, and head of the National Movement Party.

Early life and education 
Leila bin Khalifa was born on October 11, 1975, in the Libyan city of Zuwara. She has earned a Master's degree in Business Administration in 2017, and a diploma in diplomatic and consular consulting in 2018. Under Libyan electoral law, candidates are required to have a university degree from an accredited university.

Political activism

Laila bin Khalifa is a known activist and has history of campaigning for more women to enter the political life of Libya. As General Coordinator of the We Look 30 campaign, which was launched in 2018 to support and empower women, especially, the idea of quotas for women in elections.

She founded the National Movement Party (Arabic: حزب الحركة الوطنية)  inspired by the 1940s Bashir El Saadawi movement and the defunct National Congress Party.

2022 presidential run

On 22 November 2021, as head of the National Movement Party, Leila bin Khalifa stated her intention to run for the presidency of Libya, submitting her candidacy file for the presidential elections.

Bin Khalifa is the first-ever female presidential candidate in the history of the Libya after she submitted her papers to National Elections Commission.

Platform
Her political platform has these goals: 
 advocating for women in decision-making places, especially in the legislative authority; and 
 Women representation should not be less than 30% in parliament, ministries and the government.

Personal life

Born in the city of Zuwara, Leila bin Khalifa has Amazigh origins. Currently she lives in Tripoli, and she is married.

See also
2022 Libyan presidential election

References

1975 births
Living people
Libyan activists
Libyan journalists
Libyan politicians